The Black Siren (Spanish: La sirena negra) is a 1947 Spanish drama film directed by Carlos Serrano de Osma and starring Fernando Fernán Gómez, Isabel de Pomés and María Asquerino. A man falls in love with a dying young woman. It was based on a novel by Emilia Pardo Bazán.

Cast
 Fernando Fernán Gómez
 María Asquerino
 Isabel de Pomés
 José María Lado
 Anita Farra 
 Ketty Clavijo    
 Graciela Crespo   
 Ramón Martori

References

Bibliography
 Bentley, Bernard. A Companion to Spanish Cinema. Boydell & Brewer 2008. 
 Labanyi, Jo & Pavlović, Tatjana. A Companion to Spanish Cinema. John Wiley & Sons, 2012.

External links 

1947 films
1947 drama films
Spanish drama films
1940s Spanish-language films
Films directed by Carlos Serrano de Osma
Films based on Spanish novels
Films scored by Jesús García Leoz
Spanish black-and-white films
1940s Spanish films